Dąbie (Polish: Dąbie or Jezioro Dąbskie, German: Dammscher See) is a lake in the delta of the Oder in northwestern Poland at Szczecin. To the South of the lake lies the Szczecin suburban district also called Dąbie.

See also
West Oder

References
 Opis Odrzańskiej Drogi Wodnej Zawartej w granicach RZGW Szczecin. Regionalny Zarząd Gospodarki Wodnej w Szczecinie.

Lakes of Poland
Lakes of West Pomeranian Voivodeship